Pat Harrington (born April 17, 1965) is a Canadian former professional soccer player who played as a goalkeeper. He made one appearance for the Canada national team.

Club career
In December 1983, the Toronto Blizzard selected Harrington in the first round (second overall) of the 1983 North American Soccer League draft.  He moved to English side Charlton Athletic before signing with the Toronto Blizzard in 1986. In his debut season with Toronto he played in the National Soccer League where he assisted in securing the NSL Canadian Championship. The following season he continued playing with the Blizzard in the Canadian Soccer League. He then played for Montreal outfits Supra and Impact.  In 1994, he joined the Buffalo Blizzard of the National Professional Soccer League.  He scored in the team's second game of the season, but played only eleven games that year due to injury.  During the 1996-1997 NPSL season, Harrington had the league's lowest goals against average.  On March 4, 1996, the Kansas City Wiz selected Harrington in the first round (fifth overall) of the 1996 MLS Supplemental Draft. He began the season with Kansas City, but moved to the Columbus Crew.  The Crew released him at the end of the season.  On April 24, 1997, the Detroit Safari selected Harrington in the first round (fifth overall) of the Continental Indoor Soccer League draft.  In 1999 and 2000, he played for the Sacramento Knights in the World Indoor Soccer League.

International career
Harrington made his senior debut for Canada in a September 1992 friendly match against the USA, coming on as a second-half substitute for Paul Dolan. It proved to be his only international appearance.

He did however also play at the inaugural 1989 FIFA Futsal World Championship.
.

References

External links
 
 
 
 

1965 births
Living people
Soccer players from Montreal
Buffalo Blizzard players
Canadian soccer players
Canada men's international soccer players
Charlton Athletic F.C. players
Continental Indoor Soccer League players
Detroit Safari players
Sporting Kansas City players
Association football goalkeepers
Sacramento Knights players
Toronto Blizzard (1986–1993) players
Major League Soccer players
Montreal Supra players
Montreal Impact (1992–2011) players
National Professional Soccer League (1984–2001) players
World Indoor Soccer League players
Columbus Crew players
Canadian National Soccer League players
Canadian Soccer League (1987–1992) players
American Professional Soccer League players
A-League (1995–2004) players
Expatriate footballers in England
Canada men's youth international soccer players
Sporting Kansas City draft picks
Canadian expatriate soccer players
Canadian expatriate sportspeople in England